The Cathedral of Christ the Saviour is in Moscow.

Cathedral of Christ the Saviour may also refer to:
 Cathedral of the Transfiguration of the Savior in the Wood in Kremlin, Moscow
 Cathedral of Christ the Saviour (Kaliningrad)
 Cathedral of Christ the Saviour (Uzhhorod)
 Cathedral of Christ the Saviour (Banja Luka)
 Cathedral of Christ the Saviour (Shushi)
 Church of Christ the Saviour (Pristina)